Naryanguda is a neighbourhood in Hyderabad, Telangana, India. There is a YMCA that is quite popular for its cultural events and basketball court. There is a famous church in this locality.

Resident life
Narayanguda was the first area in Hyderabad to be recognised as an education area. 

It is home to the popular Raja Bahadur Venkat Rama Reddy Women's College, popularly known as Reddy College, which was established very early. Almost every college has a branch in Narayanaguda and students are a common sight. Famous colleges including Narayana, Ratna, Nalanda, Keshav Memorial and Sri Vaishnavi are here. IMS, which is an institute for MBA test preparation, has a branch in Narayanguda as well. Schools like Narayana Concept and Brilliant Grammar are here. TIME, a training institute for MBA entrance examination, has a branch opposite the Blood Bank.

The famous veterinary Narayanaguda Hospital, popular for treating dog bites, and the Madapati Hanumantha Rao Girls' High School are in Narayanguda. It is home to some of the popular cinema theatres like Shanti 70 MM and Deepak 70 MM.

Transport
Naryanguda is well connected by the system of buses, TSRTC, which ply on two routes covering most of the area. The closest MMTS Train station is at Kachiguda.Recently Narayanguda Metro station has been opened to public

References

External links

Neighbourhoods in Hyderabad, India